The Ball of Fortune is a 1925 sports mystery novel by the British writer Sydney Horler, a prolific author. As with many other of his novels during the decade it was serialised by the News of the World.

Film adaptation
In 1926 it was adapted into a silent film of the same title featuring real-life football Billy Meredith as well as actors Mabel Poulton, Dorothy Boyd and John Longden. Shooting took place at Elland Road, home of Leeds United.

References

Bibliography
 Glynn, Stephen. The British Football Film. Springer, 2018.
 Goble, Alan. The Complete Index to Literary Sources in Film. Walter de Gruyter, 1999.

1925 British novels
British sports novels
British mystery novels
Novels set in England
British novels adapted into films
Novels about association football
Novels by Sydney Horler
Hodder & Stoughton books